The Lakehurst School District is a community public school district serving students in pre-kindergarten through eighth grade from Lakehurst, in Ocean County, New Jersey, United States.

As of the 2018–19 school year, the district, comprised of one school, had an enrollment of 374 students and 35.1 classroom teachers (on an FTE basis), for a student–teacher ratio of 10.7:1.

The district is classified by the New Jersey Department of Education as being in District Factor Group "B", the second lowest of eight groupings. District Factor Groups organize districts statewide to allow comparison by common socioeconomic characteristics of the local districts. From lowest socioeconomic status to highest, the categories are A, B, CD, DE, FG, GH, I and J.

Public school students from Lakehurst in ninth through twelfth grades attend Manchester Township High School in Manchester Township, as part of a sending/receiving relationship with the Manchester Township School District. As of the 2018–19 school year, the high school had an enrollment of 1,006 students and 82.8 classroom teachers (on an FTE basis), for a student–teacher ratio of 12.1:1.

History
In October 1973, the Lakehurst district announced that its students would be shifted from Central Regional High School to the new Manchester Township High School. The school opened in September 1976 for nearly 800 students from both Lakehurst and Manchester Township.

The Lakehurst district decided in 2012 against a proposal that would have had borough students attend Jackson Liberty High School as part of a sending / receiving relationship with the Jackson School District. The change in the sending relationship had been considered as a means of reducing the costs associated with paying $14,000 for each of the 150 students attending Manchester High School, as opposed to the $11,300 that would have been paid at Jackson, yielding annual savings of $400,000, less the added cost of transporting students to and from Jackson.

Attendance boundary
The district includes students from the Lakehurst component of Joint Base McGuire–Dix–Lakehurst.

School
Lakehurst Elementary School had an enrollment of 366 students in grades PreK-8 in the 2018–19 school year.
Stephanie Rucci, Vice Principal of Student and Staff Development

Administration
Core members of the district's administration are:
Loren Fuhring, Superintendent
Barry Parliman, Business Administrator / Board Secretary

Board of education
The district's board of education, comprised of five members, sets policy and oversees the fiscal and educational operation of the district through its administration. As a Type II school district, the board's trustees are elected directly by voters to serve three-year terms of office on a staggered basis, with one or two seats up for election each year held (since 2012) as part of the November general election. The board appoints a superintendent to oversee the day-to-day operation of the district.

References

External links
Lakehurst Elementary School

School Data for the Lakehurst Elementary School, National Center for Education Statistics
Manchester Township High School

Lakehurst, New Jersey
New Jersey District Factor Group B
School districts in Ocean County, New Jersey
Public K–8 schools in New Jersey